Willard Arnold E Manders (born 26 April 1959 in Bermuda and usually known as Arnold) is a former Bermudian cricketer. He was a right-handed batsman and a right-arm off-break bowler. He played six List A matches for Bermuda as part of the 1996 Red Stripe Bowl and also played in four ICC Trophy tournaments.

References
Cricket Archive profile
Cricinfo profile

1959 births
Living people
Bermudian cricketers
Bermudian cricket coaches
Coaches of the Bermuda national cricket team